"Feel Flows" is a song recorded by American rock band the Beach Boys from their 1971 album Surf's Up. It was written by guitarist Carl Wilson and band manager Jack Rieley, and was one of Wilson's first songs.

Background and recording

The basic track of "Feel Flows" was recorded before Wilson asked Rieley to pen lyrics for the song. In 1971, Wilson explained to Rolling Stone how he produced the keyboard sound effects:

Asked about the song in a 2013 interview, Rieley said:

Wilson's lead vocals were recorded using reverse echo. The saxophone and flute were both played by jazz musician Charles Lloyd, as Mike Love commented, "It's amazing. It's unlike anything we ever did."

Reception
Biographer Jon Stebbins identified the song as a highlight on Surf's Up. He said that Jack Rieley's lyrics were "nonsensical but fit Carl's airy jazz-rock song perfectly. The trippy phasing and synthesizer elements in 'Feel Flows,' which are tailor-made for a stoner's headphones, undoubtedly delighted more than a few hippies who stumbled upon the Surf's Up LP. ... as modern and progressive as the majority of 'heavy' music in the mainstream rock world of 1971." Conversely, biographer Peter Ames Carlin criticized the lyrics as "impossibly cryptic". Record Collectors Jamie Atkins wrote that, "despite the hamfisted lyrics", the song "remains sonically intriguing, with the lightness of touch and natural feel for arranging that had served Brian so well."

Almost Famous

Director Cameron Crowe used the song twice in his 2000 film Almost Famous. It first plays during a scene in which the protagonist meets a groupie, and reappears during the closing credits. Crowe cited "Feel Flows" as his favorite Beach Boys song and explained that it contains "the happy/sad greatness that defines the group and the timelessness that allows The Beach Boys to tower over any attempt to classify them as simple poster boys for the California experience. It is the essence of the fulfilled promise of The Beach Boys and everything Brian envisioned for their creative journey." According to biographer Mark Dillon, the song received "new life from exposure in the film and inclusion on its Grammy Award–winning soundtrack."

Other uses
 In 1972, the song was used in the surfing documentary Five Summer Stories.
 In 2005, it appeared on a compilation album of music that has inspired the Welsh indie-psychedelic pop band the Super Furry Animals titled Under the Influence.
 In 2021, the song's title was adopted for Feel Flows, an archival release dedicated to the band's Sunflower and Surf's Up period.

Personnel
Credits from Craig Slowinski and Tom Nolan

The Beach Boys
Carl Wilson – lead and backing vocals, vocal noises, electric guitar, bass guitar, pianos, pianos w/ taped strings, Baldwin organ, Moog synthesizer, jingle sticks
Brian Wilson – backing vocals
Bruce Johnston – backing vocals

Additional musicians
Stephen W. Desper - Moog programming
Charles Lloyd – tenor saxophone, flute
Diane Rovell - backing vocals
Jack Rieley - vocal noises
Woody Theus – bass drum, jingle sticks
Marilyn Wilson - backing vocals

References

1971 songs
The Beach Boys songs
Progressive pop songs
Songs written by Carl Wilson
Songs written by Jack Rieley
Song recordings produced by the Beach Boys